Ivan Aleksandrovich Lebedev (1856 or 1861, Arkhangelsk Governorate – after 1917) was a son of an orthodox priest, a member of the Socialist Revolutionary Party, a justice of the peace, and a deputy of the Second Duma of the Russian Empire from the Arkhangelsk Governorate (1907); some sources state that he became a member of the Trudoviks.

Literature 
 
 Лебедев (in Russian) // Члены Государственной думы (портреты и биографии): Четвертый созыв, 1912—1917 г. / сост. М. М. Боиович. — Москва: Тип. Т-ва И. Д. Сытина, 1913. — P. 1. — LXIV, 454, [2] p.

1861 births
Year of death missing
People from Arkhangelsk Governorate
Socialist Revolutionary Party politicians
Members of the 2nd State Duma of the Russian Empire